Mikhail Pavlovich Tomsky  (Russian: Михаи́л Па́влович То́мский, born Mikhail Pavlovich Yefremovsometimes transliterated as Efremov; Михаи́л Па́влович Ефре́мов; 31 October 1880 – 22 August 1936) was a factory worker, trade unionist and Bolshevik leader and Soviet politician. He was the Chairman of the All-Union Central Council of Trade Unions in the 1920s.

In his youth, Tomsky worked at the Smirnov Engineering factory in St. Petersburg, but was eventually dismissed from that job for attempting to organise a trade union.

His labour activities radicalized him politically and led him to become a socialist and join the Russian Social Democratic Labour Party in 1904 and eventually join the Bolshevik faction of the party. 

During the First Moscow Trial, at the onset of the Great Purge, Tomsky was implicated. He would later commit suicide to avoid arrest by the NKVD in August 1936.

Early life (1880–1920)
Born in Kolpino, Saint Petersburg Governorate in a lower-middle-class family of Russian ethnicity, Tomsky moved to Estonia (then part of the Russian Empire) and was involved in the 1905 Revolution. He helped form the Revel Soviet of Workers' Deputies and the Revel Union of Metal Workers. Tomsky was arrested and deported to Siberia.

He escaped and returned to St. Petersburg where he became president of the Union of Engravers and Chromolithographers.

Tomsky was arrested in 1908 and then exiled to France, but returned to Russia in 1909 where he was again arrested for his political activities and sentenced to five years of hard labour. He was freed by the Provisional Government after the February Revolution in 1917 and moved to Moscow where he participated in the October Revolution. In 1918 he attended the Fourth All Russian Conference of Trade Unions (12–17 March), where he moved a resolution concerning the Relations between the Trade Unions and the Commissariat for Labour which stated that the October Revolution had changed  "the meaning and character of state organs and significance of proletarian organs as well". It was elaborated that previously the old ministry of Labour had acted as arbitrator between Labour and Capital, whereas the new Commissariat was the champion of the economic policy of the working class.

Career (1920–1928)

He was elected to the Central Committee in March 1919, to its Orgburo in 1921 and to the Politburo in April 1922.

Tomsky was an ally of Nikolai Bukharin and Alexey Rykov, who led the moderate (or right) wing of the Communist Party in the 1920s.

Together, they were allied with Joseph Stalin's faction and helped him purge the United Opposition - led by Leon Trotsky, Lev Kamenev, and Grigory Zinoviev - from the Party during the struggle that followed Lenin's death in 1924.

Demise (1928–1936)
In 1928 Stalin moved against his former allies, defeating Bukharin, Rykov and Tomsky at the April 1929 Plenary Meeting of the Central Committee and forcing Tomsky to resign from his position as leader of the trade union movement in May 1929. Tomsky was put in charge of the Soviet chemical industry, a position which he occupied until 1930. He was not re-elected to the Politburo after the 16th Communist Party Congress in July 1930, but remained a full member of the Central Committee until the next Congress in January 1934, when he was demoted to candidate (non-voting) member.

Tomsky headed the State Publishing House from May 1932 until August 1936, when he was accused of terrorist connections during the First Moscow Trial of Zinoviev and Kamenev. Rather than face arrest by the NKVD, Tomsky committed suicide by gunshot in his dacha in Bolshevo, near Moscow.

Legacy 
Tomsky was posthumously found guilty of participation in an anti-Soviet conspiracy during the Trial of the Twenty-One in March 1938. 

In 1988, during Perestroika, the Soviet government cleared Tomsky of all charges, and he was reinstated as a member of the Communist Party of the Soviet Union.

References

Bibliography

 Politicheckie deyateli Rossii 1917: Biograficheskij slovar'. Moscow, 1993. Excerpts available online.
 Robert C. Tucker, Memoir of a Stalin Biographer

External links
 
 Tomsky Archive Marxists Internet Archive
 The trade unions, the party and the state a pamphlet by Tomsky

1880 births
1936 suicides
People from Kolpino
People from Tsarskoselsky Uyezd
Old Bolsheviks
Politburo of the Central Committee of the Communist Party of the Soviet Union members
Executive Committee of the Communist International
Right Opposition
Soviet politicians who committed suicide
Suicides by firearm in the Soviet Union
Suicides by firearm in Russia
Soviet rehabilitations